Bideford is a historic port town on the estuary of the River Torridge in north Devon, south-west England. It is the main town of the Torridge local government district.

Toponymy
In ancient records Bideford is recorded as Bedeford, Byddyfrod, Bedyford, Bydeford, Bytheford and Biddeford. The etymology of the name means "by the ford", and records show that before there was a bridge there was a ford at Bideford where River Torridge is estuarine, and at low tide, it is possible, but not advisable, to cross the river by wading on foot.
The Welsh  means "this is the way" or "this is the road" owing to the Celtic legacy of the Dumnonians and their common ancestry with the Welsh.

History

Early history
Hubba the Dane was said to have attacked Devon in the area around Bideford near Northam or near Kenwith Castle, and was repelled by either Alfred the Great (849–899) or by the Saxon Earl of Devon.

The manor of Bideford was recorded in the Domesday Book of 1086 as held at some time in chief from William the Conqueror by the great Saxon nobleman Brictric, but later held by the king's wife Matilda of Flanders (c. 1031 – 1083). There were then 30 villagers, 8 smallholders and 14 slaves in Bideford, within the ancient hundred of Merton in Devon. According to the account by the Continuator of Wace and others, in his youth Brictric declined the romantic advances of Matilda and his great fiefdom was thereupon seized by her. Whatever the truth of the matter, years later, when she was acting as regent in England for William the Conqueror, she used her authority to confiscate Brictric's lands and threw him into prison, where he died. The Exon Domesday notes that Bideford and nearby Littleham were held at fee farm from the king by Gotshelm, a Devonshire tenant-in-chief of 28 manors and brother of Walter de Claville. Gotshelm's 28 manors descended to the Honour of Gloucester, as did most of Brictric's.

Brictric's lands were granted after the death of Matilda in 1083 by her eldest son King William Rufus (1087–1100) to Robert FitzHamon (died 1107), the conqueror of Glamorgan, whose daughter and sole heiress Maud (or Mabel) FitzHamon brought them to her husband Robert de Caen, 1st Earl of Gloucester (pre-1100 – 1147), a natural son of Matilda's younger son King Henry I (1100–1135). Thus Brictric's fiefdom became the feudal barony of Gloucester. The Grenville family held Bideford for many centuries under the overlordship of the feudal barons of Gloucester, which barony was soon absorbed into the Crown, when they became tenants in chief.

Sir Richard I de Grenville (d.post 1142) (alias de Grainvilla, de Greinvill, etc.) was one of the Twelve Knights of Glamorgan who served in the Norman Conquest of Glamorgan under his elder brother Robert FitzHamon (died 1107), the first Norman feudal baron of Gloucester and Lord of Glamorgan from 1075. He obtained from FitzHamon the lordship of Neath, Glamorgan, in which he built Neath Castle and in 1129 founded Neath Abbey. Richard de Grenville was one of three (or four) known sons of Hamo Dapifer (died circa 1100) Sheriff of Kent, an Anglo-Norman royal official under both King William the Conqueror (1066–1087) and his son King William Rufus (1087–1100). He is by tradition the founder and ancestor of the prominent Westcountry Grenville family of Stowe in the parish of Kilkhampton in Cornwall and of Bideford in Devon.

By tradition Richard de Grenville is said by Prince (died 1723), (apparently following Fuller's Worthies) to have founded Neath Abbey and bestowed upon it all his military acquisitions for its maintenance, and to have
"returned to his patrimony at Bideford where he lived in great honour and reputation the rest of his days".

However, according to Round (died 1928) "no proof exists that Richard I de Grenville ever held the manor of Bideford, which was later one of the principal seats of the Westcountry Grenville family. It was however certainly one of the constituent manors of the Honour of Gloucester granted by King William Rufus to Robert FitzHamon." Richard de Grenville is known to have held seven knight's fees from the Honour of Gloucester, either granted to him by his brother FitzHamon or the latter's son-in-law and heir Robert, 1st Earl of Gloucester (1100–1147). Round supposes instead that the Grenvilles of Bideford and Stowe were descended from a certain "Robert de Grenville" (alias de Grainville, de Grainavilla, etc.) who was a junior witness to Richard's foundation charter of Neath Abbey, and who in the 1166 Cartae Baronum return was listed as holding one knight's fee from the Earl of Gloucester, feudal baron of Gloucester. Robert's familial relationship, if any, to Richard is unknown.

A charter was granted in 1272 to Richard V de Grenville by King Henry III, which created the town's first council. In ancient records Bideford was recorded as a borough but has only returned members to Parliament during the reigns of Edward I (1272–1307) and Edward II (1307–1327).

1500–1700

The Grenville family were for many centuries lords of the manor of Bideford and played a major role in the town's development. The monument with an effigy of Sir Thomas Grenville (died 1513) exists in St Mary's Church. His great-great-grandson Sir Richard Grenville (1542–1591), the captain of the Revenge, was born in the manor house in Bideford, formerly situated on the site of numbers 1–3 Bridge Street. He built himself a new mansion on the quayside in 1585. The family had another seat at Stow House, Kilkhampton, near Bude in Cornwall. Grenville played a major role in the transformation of the small fishing port of Bideford in North Devon into what became a significant trading port with the new American colonies, later specialising in tobacco importation. In 1575 he created the Port of Bideford. Grenville was never elected as Mayor of Bideford, preferring instead to support John Salterne in that role, but he was Lord of the Manor, a title held by the Grenvilles since 1126 and finally ceded by his descendants in 1711 to the Town Council he established. On his return from Roanoke Colony Grenville's ship Tiger captured a Spanish galleon the Santa Maria de San Vicente off Bermuda in late August 1585. The Spanish prize was brought into Bideford with riches valued at around 15,000 pounds. Grenville also brought a Native American "Wynganditoian" from Roanoke Island with him after returning from a voyage to America in 1586. Grenville named this Native American tribesman Raleigh after his cousin Sir Walter Raleigh. Raleigh converted to Christianity and was baptised at Saint Mary's Church on 27 March 1588, but died from influenza during his residence in Grenville's house on 2 April 1589. His interment was at the same church five days later. Sir Richard Grenville's great-grandson, Sir John Granville, helped restore Charles II to the throne, and in 1661 Charles made Sir John Granville Baron Granville of Bideford and Earl of Bath.

During the English Civil War, Bideford stood with the Parliamentarians against the Royalist forces of Charles I. Following a series of Royalist successes in the South West during 1643, the Parliamentarians withdrew into Bideford and its two small fortresses, one of which was Chudleigh Fort. Here they were besieged. After further Royalist victories it became clear that Bideford would not be relieved, and in August 1643 it was stormed by Royalist forces. Following fierce fighting around the two forts, the town fell.

In 1646, 229 people in the town were killed by the plague. It was suggested that a Spanish vessel laden with wool which docked at the quay may have brought this plague to Bideford, and that it was children playing with the wool who first got infected with the plague. Victims were buried from 8 June 1646 to 18 January the next year. After the revocation of the Edict of Nantes and the expulsion of French Protestants from France a considerable number of them immigrated to Bideford, and they brought a lot of new trades to the town, including silk weaving.

In the 16th century the merchant and ship owner John Strange was born in the town. When he was in his youth, he fell from a cliff yet did not suffer any injury, then later on in his life someone fired an arrow at his forehead, but it did not penetrate his skull, and the only lasting damage was a scar. Once a malicious person tried to throw him over the Long Bridge, the walls of the bridge being very low, but was unexpectedly and luckily interrupted.

Witch trial
The Bideford witch trial in 1682 involved three women, Temperance Lloyd, Mary Trembles and Susannah Edwards, accused of witchcraft and which resulted in one of the last hangings for witchcraft in England.

1800–1939

In 1816 a mob forced their way into Bideford prison to try and break out some of the mob's ringleaders, and soldiers from the Royal North Devon Yeomanry had to be mustered, and then patrolled the town, where they arrested several members of the mob who were then escorted to Exeter. In 1835 the Bideford Poor Law Union was founded; followed by the building, in 1837, of the Bideford workhouse in Meddon Street. The workhouse had a 40-bed infirmary and would later become Torridge Hospital and, eventually, a residential building. In 1830 it was reported that 5000 people waved farewell to ships leaving Bideford for New York City, Montreal, and St. Andrews (New Brunswick). Between the years 1840 and 1900 2,467 people emigrated to Canada and 248 to the United States aboard ships from Bideford. In 1847 a horse-drawn omnibus taking people to a fair in Torrington fell off Bideford Quay into the River Torridge, and eight people were drowned. The book "Kingsley's County" put the expansion and growth of Bideford down to the publication of Charles Kingsley's romance Westward Ho! in 1855. There was an extension of the London and South Western Railway from Barnstaple in 1856. The Pannier Market opened in 1884. In 1902 the first car arrived in Bideford: it was owned by Dr E.J. Toye, the car being a 4-1/2 hp Benz.

World War II
In 1942 American GIs arrived in Bideford. At first they were there to work in radar stations across North Devon and work on experimental things. More American troops began to arrive as the war progressed. Experiments nearby, including The Great Panjandrum, were said to be viewed in the area in secret by Dwight D. Eisenhower and Sir Winston Churchill at the Strand Cinema. In 1943 more Americans arrived as D-day training had begun at beaches across North Devon During the war Bideford Ordnance Experimental Station Depot O-617 was set up to experiment on waterproofing equipment for the D-day landings. The Americans' GI camp was at Bowden Green in Bideford, and had plenty of facilities, including a cinema. There was also a vehicle repair shop off the Kingsley Road, and the Pill was taken over by US forces as well. Because of the sheer number of American soldiers in the area by 1943 the American Red Cross opened a club near Chudleigh Fort in East-the-Water. Bideford had an Auxiliary Unit Patrol at Cleave Mine, the men of this patrol were expected to be the resistance if Britain was invaded. During the war 2700 evacuees were expected in Bideford; a large number of these came and stayed throughout the war. During World War II a bomb was dropped on a house in Bowden Green and caused substantial damage. Also during the war an RCAF bomber crashed in East the Water; three men were killed and one badly injured. A memorial has been put on the Tarka Trail to commemorate this. It is also thought that during the war there was an experimental Royal Navy unit testing a secret petrol pipeline in the river. It is thought that after being rescued in the Bristol Channel, some German airman were brought ashore at Bideford, where they were taken to Bideford Hospital. There was also a POW camp at Handy Cross. It has been discovered that the Nazis had a map of Bideford in readiness for a possible invasion,  also that the Nazis had an aerial picture of the area for intelligence purposes.

Long Bridge

The original Long Bridge spanning the River Torridge connecting the East and West of the town was said to have been built out of timber in the year 1286. In 1474 the original structure was replaced by the masonry arch bridge seen today. The bridge was built around the timber so people could still use it while construction was taking place, possibly resulting in the 24 arches all being of different sizes. A traditional explanation is that each arch was funded by a different local guild, although there are no records to confirm this. Another theory is that the piers of the arches of the bridge were built on naturally existing, and therefore randomly situated, large stones in the river. During the first decade of the 17th century, the bridge trustees were taken to court by the people of Bideford for feasting and seeing plays at the expense of the trust funds. The people won the court case, although it is unclear whether the trustees were forced to resign after the scandal, or whatever else happened to them. In 1790 the bridge was the longest in Devon. In the 1820s there was talk of converting the bridge so that it could be raised and lowered to allow larger boats and ships to pass under it. In 1886 a Ship called 'Edward Birkbeck' launched from a Bideford shipyard hit the bridge, but only caused small damage by knocking some of the stones out. In 1925 another incident took place on the bridge: during the widening of the bridge a lorry came off the side of the bridge and crashed into the River Torridge, and it is believed that both the people in the lorry survived. During World War II the 10th arch of the bridge was being repaired, and the police asked for ladders and scaffolding to be removed from the bridge to prevent potential invaders climbing up and capturing the bridge. During the war the Home Guard patrolled the bridge. The Bideford Bridge Trust held responsibility for the long bridge right up until the year 1968 when one of the arches of the bridge collapsed. The Department of Transport then took over the bridge. During the rebuilding of that damaged part of the bridge a crane toppled over, and a man was killed. An inspection by Devon County Council in July 2007 revealed problems with the bridge's concrete and structure, so in September 2008 work began on putting in the cathodic protection system which restored the bridge for another 60 years. A sight which many holiday-makers and locals enjoy is seeing the starlings at dusk, as they roost underneath the bridge.

Port and shipping

By the 16th century Bideford had become Britain's third largest port. Sir Walter Raleigh landed his first shipment of tobacco here, although, contrary to popular belief, he was not the first to import tobacco to England. Several local roads and a hill have been named after Raleigh. Bideford was heavily involved in the transport of indentured servants to the New World colonies. Bideford also was heavily involved in the Newfoundland cod trade from the 16th century to the mid-18th century. 28 Bideford vessels with a tonnage of 3860 were involved in this practice in the year 1700. In the years 1706, 1707, 1726 and 1758 fishermen of Bideford sent petitions demanding the building of a fort in Newfoundland to protect them from Native Americans and the French.  Bideford also imported large amounts of Irish wool in the 18th century.

Two prominent shipbuilders in Bideford were George Crocker and Richard Chapman: they built a large number of ships. Around 150 ships were built between 1840 and 1877 at Higher Cleave Houses in Bideford. The largest wooden ship to be built in Bideford was the Sarah Newman, a 1,004-ton full-rigged ship built in 1855. During the 19th century over 815 registered wooden sailing ships were launched on the Torridge, as too were hundreds of unregistered craft. Shipbuilding in the Bideford area declined during the 1890s as shipyards in Britain's industrial regions constructed steel steamships. The last wooden merchant ship launched in the River Torridge was the schooner PT Harris from the Hubbastone yard of PK Harris & Sons, in 1912.

Nowadays the only shipbuilding in the area is at Appledore Shipbuilders, which has built civilian ships and ships for the Royal Navy and Irish Naval Service. Currently ball clay is exported from Bideford to Castellón, Spain and also Naantali, Finland; also wood has been exported to Wismar, Germany. The , the last remaining British-built wooden-hull three-masted topsail schooner, is registered in Bideford and was at one time based there. There are also some fishing boats that still operate out of Bideford.

Literary references
This area of North Devon was home to the author Charles Kingsley, and is where he based his novel Westward Ho!. A small seaside town, named after the book, was built after the book's publication.

Westward Ho!, the only town in the United Kingdom which officially contains an exclamation mark in its name, is approximately three miles (5 km) from Bideford. A statue was erected in honour of Kingsley near the car park of Victoria Park.

Namesakes
The city of Biddeford, Maine, in the United States was named after the English town, using the original old English spelling. Also, the town of Bideford in the province of Prince Edward Island, Canada, is named after the English town, as is the small town of Bideford, New Zealand.

Bideford Black
Bideford Black is a unique pigment which was mined for 200 years up until 1969 in Bideford and the surrounding area. The deposits were formed 350 million years ago during the Carboniferous period on Gondwana. Bideford Black contains carbon, silica and alumina, with the black colouration created by the carbon. The seams containing Bideford Black Stretch from Hartland, underneath Bideford, and onto Umberleigh. Bideford Black was used in a number of ways; for example, it was used as camouflage paint during World War II, in mascara by Max Factor, by artists, and in the boat-building industry. Bideford Black was processed as a paint and a dye up until the mining stopped. A number of artists (mainly local artists) used these Bideford Black paints and oils in their works. The Bideford Black Mining Company produced Biddiblack powder at a processing plant in Chapel Park, East-the-Water. Some of the miners' houses were situated at Springfield Terrace, East-the-Water.

The mining of the pigment became unviable when other blacks went into large, cheap commercial production. Bideford Black has also been known as "The Mother of Coal"; there are still a number of places where evidence of the mine can be seen, like old mine entrances just off the Barnstaple road. A number of roads are named after the mining in the town, including Mines Road, Pitt Lane, Biddiblack Way and other roads.

Recently some Bideford Black was exchanged, by locals, for some pigments provided by Australian Aboriginal Elder Noel Butler. Noel Butler's nephew has used the Bideford Black to paint his body for Aboriginal ceremonial events in Australia. The Heritage lottery fund has given a grant of £8700 to the Burton Art Gallery to fund research into Bideford Black. In October 2013 a display about Bideford Black was presented at Bideford's Burton Art Gallery.

Demography

In 2011 government statistics recorded the population at 17,107, its highest ever. Between 2011 and 2026 Bideford's population is expected to rise by 9,689 people. The birth rate in Bideford is 60.2 out of 1000 women, compared with the 52.8 per 1000 women which is the average for Devon. Life expectancy in Bideford is 80.7 years, that is 0.9 years less than the average for Devon. Bideford has the highest rate of youth offending in Devon at 21.5 in 1000 people, compared with 13.2 in a 1000 people as the Devon average.

Unlike some areas of the UK, Bideford is not that ethnically diverse: in 2001 98.3% of the population were white in the parish, meaning just 246 people were black or from a minority ethnic group: the 2001 average for England was 9.1% of people from black or ethnic minorities. 3.3% of school children are from black or ethnic minorities and 0.9% of school children do not have English as their first language; this is the lowest in Devon. In 2001 31.6% of households were classed as "single person households". In 2004 Bideford was classed as one of the most deprived areas in the Torridge area. In November 2008 1.95% of the population claimed job-seekers allowance. Domestic violence rates are 2.6% higher than the Devon average, alcohol-related crime is 0.4% higher than the Devon average, and drugs-related crime is the same as the Devon average.

Transport

Roads
Bideford is served by the A39 Atlantic Highway and A386 roads.

Ferry
The same ship, the MS Oldenburg, also provides evening cruises downstream from Bideford along the River Torridge.

South West Coast Path
The South West Coast Path National Trail runs through the town, and gives access to the North Devon coast.

Bus

There are several bus services most of which are provided by Stagecoach South West. These include:
21 North Devon Wave – Ilfracombe/Braunton – Barnstaple – Fremington – Bideford – Westward Ho!
21A north Devon Wave – Georgeham – Braunton – Barnstaple – Fremington – Bideford and Appledore
5B Barnstaple – Torrington – Crediton – Exeter
319 Barnstaple – Bideford – Abbotsham – Woolsery – Hartland – Bude
85 Barnstaple – Holsworthy
75 Weare Giffard – Torrington – Dartington Fields
75A Affinity Outlet – Torrington – Hatherleigh – Okehampton 
75B  Barnstaple – Torrington – Hatherleigh – Okehampton 
Many routes are subsidised by Devon County Council.

Railway
Bideford was previously connected to the national rail network, but the connection was lost in 1982 (by then a freight branch, which was still operating due to the mining of ball clay traffic from Meeth Quarry) with the closure of the line from Barnstaple to Torrington and Meeth Quarry. Passenger services were closed in 1965 following the publication of the Beeching Report. The station still exists at East-the-Water and is now managed by a preservation group, the Bideford Railway Heritage Centre. The line followed the contours of the River Torridge for much of its route to Torrington and most of it is part of the Tarka Trail.

In 2009, James May's Toy Stories attempted to run OO gauge trains on a temporary track on the right of way. A subsequent attempt in 2011 was successful.

In 2009 the Association of Train Operating Companies costed reopening the Barnstaple to Bideford route at £80 million. But in 2010 Devon County Council rejected proposals by Torridge District Council to consider reopening.

Bideford, Westward Ho! and Appledore Railway
The Bideford, Westward Ho! and Appledore Railway was an unusual and short-lived railway built entirely on this peninsula with no direct connection to the rest of the British railway network. The locomotives were fitted with skirts to protect pedestrians, as at one point the line ran along the quay at Bideford. The line had eleven halts which largely served visitors wishing to enjoy the scenery along the coast or the beaches around Westward Ho!. The railway, although authorised in 1896, was opened only as far as Northam by 1901, and finally reached Appledore in 1908.

The railway fell into financial difficulties and in the First World War, the War Department requisitioned all of its equipment for use in France. Bideford's 13th-century Long Bridge was temporarily converted into a railway bridge to carry the locomotives and rolling stock onto the main line railway near Bideford Station.

Climate
Bideford has a wet but mild climate; during the winter Bideford experiences a lot of frosty nights and mornings and also gets some snow. During the summer Bideford can be wet, but also mild.

East-the-Water
The town of Bideford has grown to cover land on both sides of the River Torridge; the area located east of the river is known as East-the-Water  and also spelled East the Water without hyphens. Much of the land that has been built on in recent years is drained marshland.

East-the-Water has its own primary school, local shops, a few factories, approximately 3 bars and pubs, a small health centre and a small industrial area consisting largely of locally owned businesses. It is mainly public housing, especially on the Pollyfield estate. The community also has its own community centre and association, both of which are self-funding and run by a committee of local residents. A key historical feature is Chudleigh Fort, built by the Parliamentarian Major-General James Chudleigh during the English Civil War. The area is surrounded by agricultural land.

Buried in the now abandoned and neglected East-the-Water Cemetery in adjacent plots are Gerald Graham VC and George Channer VC.

Governance

Bideford Town Council, which is based at Bideford Town Hall, has 16 seats representing four unequal wards, North, South, East and South Outer. At the May 2011 local elections, seven Conservatives, three independents, two Liberal Democrats, two Labour and one Green were elected (there was one vacant seat). There is a mayor and Town Clerk. The town council received widespread attention in February 2012 when the High Court ruled that prayers as part of meetings were not lawful by the Local Government Act 1972.

Torridge District Council is the next level of local government and most decisions are made by Devon County Council. Torridge District Council is responsible for maintaining Bideford Higher Cemetery.

The local MP is the Conservative Geoffrey Cox. The two Devon County Council councillors who represent the town are Anthony Inch and Linda Hellyer, they are both members of the Conservative Party.

Education
State-funded primary schools in Bideford include East-the-Water Primary School, St. Mary's Church of England Primary School and Westcroft School. Bideford College is the main state-funded secondary school serving the area.

Kingsley School is a co-educational independent school situated in Bideford. It was founded in 2009 when Grenville College and Edgehill College merged. It is a member of the Methodist Independent Schools trust.

Religion

Bideford has a number of churches: St Mary's Church is a Church of England church, and one of the largest in the town: the clock on the 13th-century tower is visible throughout the town. The church building was rebuilt in 1862-5 when the original Norman church was pulled down and is Grade II* listed. The church enjoys a healthy relationship with the St. Mary's C of E Primary School, which is in the town: children from the school attend a number of services at the church during school time. Bideford Baptist Church is another church in the town: services are on Sundays are at 10.30, and include Communion on the 1st and 3rd Sunday of each month.

The Abundant Life Church meets at the Bideford Youth Centre on the Pill, and holds a number of events. The Lavington United Reformed Church is in Bridgeland Street, the current building opened in 1869. The Sacred Heart Catholic Church is situated on Northam Road. The Bethel Free Church is located in East-the-Water. There is also a Methodist church in Bideford High Street. In North Road there is an Evangelical Chapel.

The Religious Society of Friends has a Quaker Meeting House in Honestone Street opposite the entrance to the Pannier Market car park. There is also St Peter's Church in East-the-Water, which was built over 130 years ago, but has not been worshipped in for 10 years and is now in use as a gymnasium. In 2011 61.8% of people in Bideford and nearby Northam described themselves as Christian, 0.3% as Buddhist, 0.2% as Muslims and 0.7% were classed as part of the other religion category. The number of religious people in the area is higher than the average in Devon.

Culture

New Year traditions
Bideford is renowned for its New Year's Eve celebrations, when thousands of people – most in fancy dress – from surrounding towns, villages, and around the world gather on the quay for revelries and a fireworks display. The event normally includes a number of local musical acts performing on the X Radio One Roadshow stage.
Andrew's Dole is a custom dating from 1605. In that year, the Mayor of Bideford, Andrew Dole, established a trust to provide for loaves of bread to be distributed to poor, elderly, persons who applied at the Mayor's Parlour. The custom continues to this day and takes place on New Year's Day. He also left some land to trustees and the income is distributed to 10 deserving people, for each trustee.

Radio
Local radio was provided by Heart North Devon. The station, which started in 1992 and originally called Lantern FM, was based in Bideford in a building named "the Lighthouse", and later moved to an industrial estate in nearby Barnstaple. In April 2009 the station was rebranded as part of the Heart Network, losing the long-standing Lantern FM name. In August 2010, amid much controversy, the station was merged with its sister operations in other areas of Devon and all operations were moved to new studios in Exeter and renamed Heart Devon. As a result, numerous members of staff at Barnstaple were made redundant. Since then, many of the Lantern FM team, past and present, have reunited to create The Voice, a local radio station currently broadcasting across Devon on DAB Digital radio. The radio station was launched on FM in January 2014 after being granted an FM Licence.

Newspapers
Bideford is covered by two main local newspapers, the North Devon Gazette and the North Devon Journal which are published weekly. The Gazette was founded in Bideford, and was originally known as the Bideford Gazette. It is now a free newspaper, delivered to most local homes, and is now based in Barnstaple. The regional daily paper, the Western Morning News, is also available. A local newsletter, the Bideford Buzz, was published monthly from 2000- 18 by a team of volunteers, and from October 2018 is available online only.

Twinning
The town is twinned with Landivisiau in France. It has been twinned with Landivisiau since 1976; each year members of the Bideford Twinning Association take part in an exchange trip with Landivisiau.
On 20 October 2006, British ex-patriate David Riley came to mark the '20-year link' between Manteo on Roanoke Island, North Carolina, and Bideford. The Bideford town clerk, George McLauchlan, told him that locals had never heard of Manteo, and that the only town Bideford was twinned with was in France. Mr Riley handed over a clock to 'celebrate' the twenty-year link, while the Manteo Town manager Kermit Skinner said the link started in the 1980s during the 400th anniversary of Raleigh's voyages to America.
It turns out the 'twinning' of Bideford with Manteo had been established 20 years before. But the story goes back much further – 500 years – to the mysterious disappearance of a colony of more than 100 people on Roanoke Island, many of whom were immigrants from Bideford. The colony was established by Sir Richard Grenville, who brought back two Native American Indians, one of them called Manteo which gave the North Carolina town its name.

Art

Bideford Art School was located on The Quay from 1896 to the 1970s. Alumni included Judith Ackland and novelist Rosemary Sutcliff. Today the building houses Bideford Arts Centre. The Burton at Bideford is an art gallery and museum in the town that has collections on various things of interest connected with Bideford's heritage, including clay pipes and tea caddies. The art gallery displays work by local artists featuring local heritage and local landscapes.

Bideford Film Society

The Bideford Film Society was set up in 2001 and with the aid of a grant from the Bridge Trust and Bideford Town Council. The Bideford Film Society shows films just after their cinema release. The films are screened at Kingsley School, or in the Devon Hall at Bideford College.

Markets

In 1272 Bideford was granted a market charter, and has had many markets throughout the years. The medieval market was once held near to where the bottom of the High Street is today. The current Pannier Market has been there since 1884, and consists of a large market hall which, as well as markets, hosts boxing matches and other events; and Butchers Row which is now made up of small shops, galleries, and butchers' stalls.

A farmers' market takes place on the quay on nearly every Saturday throughout the summer. A continental market also visits Bideford annually – market traders from France, Belgium, Italy, Spain, Holland, Poland and other countries come to sell products on the quay.

Shopping

Bideford has many small shops and galleries. Affinity Devon, formerly Atlantic Village, is an outlet shopping centre on the western outskirts of the town: it has over thirty retail outlets Opposite Affinity Devon is Atlantic Park, a collection of restaurants, supermarkets and hotel chains built in 2015. This destroyed large parts of Moreton Park Woods and was campaigned against by local residents.

Sport and recreation

Bideford has two King George's Fields, which are memorials to King George V. One field is used primarily as the home ground of the main local rugby union club, Bideford RFC (Chiefs) who currently play in Tribute South West 1 West. The other field, commonly referred to as The Sports Ground, is the home to Bideford AFC, the town's main local football club, they currently play in the Southern Football League Premier Division and are managed by Sean William Joyce. In over 60 seasons, the club has never been relegated, a distinction it shares only with Arsenal and Everton.
East-the-Water also has its own football club, Shamwickshire Rovers FC, which plays at Pollyfield. There is a cricket club in the park called Victoria Park Cricket Club, but there is also Bideford, Littleham and Westward Ho! Cricket Club and they play in Westward Ho!

There are two bowling clubs in the town, one is Bideford Bowling Club who play near to The Sports Ground, and the other is Bideford Victoria Park Bowling Club. There is also a gymnastics club in the town called the North Devon Display Gymnastic Club.
In 2009 the sixth stage of the Tour of Britain finished in the town, and large crowds lined the quay where it finished. In 2012 the Tour of Britain passed through the town, again large crowds came out to watch.  On 19 March 2012 the 2012 Olympic torch relay passed through the town, when large crowds lined the town's streets, and school children from the town's schools were also allowed to line the route – even though it was during the school day.

Notable people
 Henry de Bracton, a 13th-century English cleric and jurist lived in the town. 
 Sir John Arundell was born in the town in 1421 – his father John Arundell, knight of the shire for Devon and Cornwall, lived in the town for some time. 
 Sir Richard Grenville was born in Bideford in 1542. His servant Raleigh was one of the first Native Americans to be brought to England. He died in 1589 and is buried in the churchyard of St Mary's church in the town. 
 Richard Vines a colonist was born in the town in 1585. 
 Francis Small, a landowner and trader who immigrated to New England was born in the town in 1625. 
 John Davie, tobacco merchant, was born here in 1640.
 Elisabeth Pepys, née Elisabeth de St. Michel, who later married Samuel Pepys, was born in Bideford in 1640: it has been said that Samuel Pepys courted his wife here. 
 Temperance Lloyd, Mary Trembles, and Susanna Edwards of Bideford were the last people to be hanged for witchcraft in England, in 1682.
 John Buck, son of George Buck, was a tobacco trader and Whig was born in the town in 1703. 
 Political satirist John Shebbeare was born in the town in 1709. 
 Mathematicians Abraham Donn (born 1718) and his brother Benjamin Donn (born 1729) were both from the town. 
 Physician John Mudge was born in the town in 1721. 
 John Beare, a farmer and mill-owner, was born in Bideford in 1820 and emigrated to Ontario.
 Admiral Bedford Pim was born here in 1826. 
 The first Suffragan Bishop of Crediton Robert Trefusis was born in the town in 1843. 
 Edward Capern (1819–1894), known as "the rural postman of Bideford", first secured a job at Bideford Post Office in 1848. He published four volumes of verse and was given a Civil List pension.  
 Lieutenant Colonel George Braund was born in Bideford in 1866 but emigrated to Australia when he was 15. 
 The artist and illustrator Bertram Prance was born here in 1889 and was a student at Bideford Art School. 
 Richard Bott, a skeleton racer, who competed in the 1948 Winter Olympics, was born in the town in 1900.
 The historian J. P. V. D. Balsdon was born in the town in 1901.
 Sir John Nott, the former Secretary of State for Defence, was born in the town in 1932.
 Cricket umpire David Shepherd, was born here in 1940, though at the time of his death he resided in neighbouring Instow.
 Writer Roy Kift was born in the town in 1943.
 The actress Joanna Tope was born in Bideford in 1944.
 Paul Seed, a television director and actor was born here in 1947.
 Crime fiction author Hilary Bonner was born in the town in 1949 and raised there.
 The current Bishop of Norwich Graham James was born in the town in 1951.
 John Richards, a musician working in the field of elecronic music, was born in the town in 1966.
 Conductor, pianist and composer Clarence Raybould once lived in East-the Water, and died there in 1972. He and his wife are buried in Northam.
 Cricketer Ian Gompertz was born here in 1975.
 Warwickshire county cricketer Tom Allin and the cricketer Matthew Allin were born in Bideford.
 Plymouth Argyle defender Gary Sawyer was born in Bideford in 1985.  
 Stuart Anstis, one time lead guitarist with black metal band Cradle of Filth went to school in Bideford, and now runs a guitar shop there. 
 Derry Brownson, formerly of the band EMF is frequently seen around town, and helps run a music studio in the town called Yard 1 studios. 
 Actor Joss Ackland lives near Bideford.
 T. V. Smith and Gaye Advert, from the punk band The Adverts, live here.
 Golfer Jimmy Mullen is from the town.
 Environmentalist and radiation scientist Chris Busby now lives in the place in Bridge Street where Sir Richard Grenville was born. 
 Alan Edward Roberts, the author of The Magpie, and A Century of Storms, lives in central Bideford. 
 Singer Andy Rowe lead singer of the Oggymen was reputedly born in Bideford.

References

Bibliography

Goaman, Muriel (1968) Old Bideford and District. Bristol: E. M. & A. G. Cox (3rd ed. 1978)
--do.-- (1982) Bideford in Old Picture Postcards. Zaltbommel: European Library ISBN 9028821007

External links

Bideford Town Council

 
Towns in Devon
Torridge District
Ports and harbours of Devon